Charles-Auguste de Goÿon de Matignon, comte de Gacé (1647-1729), was the French soldier, diplomat and Marshal of France.

The youngest son of François de Goÿon, sieur of Matignon (died 1675) by his wife Anne née de Malon de Bercy, he was descended from the ancient noble Breton family de Bricquebec.

A career soldier, Goÿon-Matignon rose to become Governor of Aunis (1688), Marshal of the French Army (1691), before being appointed Field Marshal (1708).

A portrait of him by Hyacinthe Rigaud hangs in the Musée des Beaux-Arts de Caen.

See also 
 Count
 Gacé
 Jacques I, Prince of Monaco

References 

1647 births
1729 deaths
French generals
French noble families
Counts of France
18th-century French diplomats
Ambassadors of France to Great Britain